The delicate dragonet (Callionymus delicatulus) is a species of dragonet native to the Red Sea through the Indian Ocean to the western Pacific Ocean. This species grows to a length of  TL.

References

External links
 

D